Reiser4 is a computer file system, successor to the ReiserFS file system, developed from scratch by Namesys and sponsored by DARPA as well as Linspire. Reiser4 was named after its former lead developer Hans Reiser. , the Reiser4 patch set is still being maintained, but according to Phoronix, it is unlikely to be merged into mainline Linux without corporate backing.

Features 
Some of the goals of the Reiser4 file system are:

 Atomicity (filesystem operations either complete, or they do not, and they do not corrupt due to partially occurring)
 Different transaction models: journaling, write-anywhere (copy-on-write), hybrid transaction model
 More efficient journaling through wandering logs
 More efficient support of small files, in terms of disk space and speed through block suballocation
 Liquid items (or virtual keys) – a special format of records in the storage tree, which completely resolves the problem of internal fragmentation
 EOTTL (extents on the twig level) – fully balanced storage tree, meaning that all paths to objects are of equal length
 Faster handling of directories with large numbers of files
 Transparent compression: Lempel-Ziv-Oberhumer (LZO), zlib
 Plugin infrastructure
 Dynamically optimized disk-layout through allocate-on-flush (also called delayed allocation in XFS)
 Delayed actions (tree balancing, compression, block allocation, local defragmentation)
 R and D (Rare and Dense) caches, synchronized at commit time
 Transactions support for user-defined integrity
 Metadata and inline-data checksums
 Mirrors and failover
 Precise discard support with delayed issuing of discard requests for SSD devices

Some of the more advanced Reiser4 features (such as user-defined transactions) are also not available because of a lack of a VFS API for them.

At present Reiser4 lacks a few standard file system features, such as an online repacker (similar to the defragmentation utilities provided with other file systems). The creators of Reiser4 say they will implement these later, or sooner if someone pays them to do so.

Performance 
Reiser4 uses B*-trees in conjunction with the dancing tree balancing approach, in which underpopulated nodes will not be merged until a flush to disk except under memory pressure or when a transaction completes. Such a system also allows Reiser4 to create files and directories without having to waste time and space through fixed blocks.

, synthetic benchmarks performed by Namesys in 2003 show that Reiser4 is 10 to 15 times faster than its most serious competitor ext3 working on files smaller than 1 KiB. Namesys's benchmarks suggest it is typically twice the performance of ext3 for general-purpose filesystem usage patterns. Other benchmarks from 2006 show results of Reiser4 being slower on many operations. Benchmarks conducted in 2013 with Linux Kernel version 3.10 show that Reiser4 is considerably faster in various tests compared to in-kernel filesystems ext4, btrfs and XFS.

Integration with Linux
Reiser4 has patches for Linux 2.6, 3.x, 4.x and 5.x., but , Reiser4 has not been merged into the mainline Linux kernel and consequently is still not supported on many Linux distributions; however, its predecessor ReiserFS v3 has been widely adopted. Reiser4 is also available from Andrew Morton's -mm kernel sources, and from Zen patch set. Linux kernel developers claim that Reiser4 does not follow Linux coding standards, but Hans Reiser suggested political reasons.
Latest released reiser4 kernel patches and tools can be downloaded from reiser4 project page at sourceforge.net

History of Reiser4 

Hans Reiser was convicted of murder on April 28, 2008, leaving the future of Reiser4 uncertain. After his arrest, employees of Namesys were assured they would continue to work and that the events would not slow down the software development in the immediate future. In order to afford increasing legal fees, Hans Reiser announced on December 21, 2006, that he was going to sell Namesys; as of March 26, 2008, it had not been sold, although the website was unavailable. In January 2008, Edward Shishkin, an employee of and programmer for Namesys, was quoted in a CNET interview saying, "Commercial activity of Namesys has stopped." Shishkin and others continued the development of Reiser4, making source code available from Shishkin's web site, later relocated to kernel.org.  Since 2008, Namesys employees have received 100% of their sponsored funding from DARPA.

In 2010, Phoronix wrote that Edward Shishkin was exploring options to get Reiser4 merged into Linux kernel mainline. , the file system is still being updated for new kernel releases, but has not been submitted for merging. In 2015, Michael Larabel mentioned it is unlikely to happen without corporate backing, and then he suggested in April 2019 that the main obstacle could be the renaming of Reiser4 to avoid reference to the initial author who was convicted of murder.

Shishkin announced a Reiser5 filesystem on December 31, 2019.

See also 
 List of file systems
 Comparison of file systems

References

External links
ReiserFS and Reiser4 wiki
Current Reiserfs4 patches as Namesys' website is down
Reiserfs v4 utilities
Introduction to Reiser4 on kuro5hin
Reiser4 transaction design document
Trees in the Reiser4 Filesystem, Part I from Linux Journal
Trees in the Reiser4 Filesystem, Part II from Linux Journal
Hans Reiser: The Reiser4 Filesystem Hans Reiser's lecture at Google
Why Reiser4 is not in the Linux Kernel at kernelnewbies.org and Hans Reiser's response to Kernelnewbies' criticism
Reiser4 and the Politics of the Kernel by Bruce Byfield on Linux.com
The Reiser4 Filesystem: Ways In Which Extra Rigor In Scientific Methodology Can Consume Years Of Your Life, And How The Result Can Be So Very Worthwhile - lecture given by Hans Reiser at Stanford University (video archive).
Reiser4 Gentoo FAQ
Metztli Reiser4 – a Debian installer including Reiser4

2004 software
Compression file systems
Disk file systems
File systems supported by the Linux kernel
Userspace file systems

de:Reiser File System#Reiser4